Top Gear Korea is the South Korean adaptation of BBC's popular Top Gear show. Officially announced on 21 June 2011, the show follows a similar format with the British version and season 1 included 3 presenters: singer and professional driver Kim Jin-pyo (김진표), actor Yeon Jung-hoon (연정훈), and actor Kim Kap-soo (김갑수). It premiered on cable channel XTM on 20 August 2011.

The show uses a circuit in Ansan city, which is not used for racing but just for tests and social events, as the main test facility and the Power Lap Time.  It was built for a Champ Car event that was cancelled less than three weeks before it was to have been held.  Korea International Circuit, the venue of the Korean Grand Prix and Taebaek Racing Park are used for some episodes.

History
The first season aired from 20 August – 30 December 2011. Met with both positive and negative reviews, the show had a peak viewership rating of 1.28%, considered to be quite good for Korean cable.

The second season aired from 8 April 2012 to 17 June 2012. Kim Kap-soo was replaced by actor Jo Min-ki (조민기).

The third season (titled Top Gear Korea New Season) aired from 7 October – 16 December 2012. Jo Min-ki was replaced by actor Park Jun-gyu (박준규). In one of the episodes, presenter Kim Jin-pyo drove a Chevrolet Spark through a 360-degree vertical loop.

A serious incident occurred during filming of the fourth season, in which a helicopter crashed into the Arizona desert. As part of a racing sequence between a Chevrolet Corvette C6 ZR1 and a Bell AH-1 Cobra helicopter, the car and the helicopter would race alongside each other to the finish line. During a practice run, as they reached the finish line, the aircraft wheeled around 180° before impacting the ground. Nobody was seriously injured. The BBC posted the video online, both in its unaltered state and open-captioned in English, the show is part of their franchise and is co-produced by the company.

Guests
Guests are featured each week in the Star Lap Time segment, akin to Star in a Reasonably Priced Car. The car driven in this segment is the Volkswagen Golf.

Season One

Season Two

Season Three

Season Four

References

External links
 http://program.tving.com/xtm/topgearkorea

Korea
South Korean variety television shows
South Korean television series based on British television series
Korean-language television shows
2011 South Korean television series debuts